Zhafri bin Yahya (born 25 September 1994) is a Malaysian footballer who plays for Malaysia  Super League side Kuala Lumpur City as a midfielder.

Early life 
He began playing futsal when he was 10 years old, and he spent a lot of time in the amateur leagues at Under-12 and Under-17 levels with Remaja Semangat Pejuang. Later, he was chosen to play for Selangor Under-15 and Under-17 football sides in at the national schools MSSM football tournament.

Club career

PKNS 
After finishing school, he joined PKNS for the Under-21 Piala Presiden.

UiTM 
He then continued his studies at UiTM Sri Iskandar Perak, where he majored in Diploma in Quantity Surveyor. He was given the opportunity to represent UiTM FC in the Malaysia Premier League while studying at UiTM.

Selangor 
He played for the Selangor's Piala Presiden team after completing three years of diploma before being loaned to Kuala Lumpur FA (currently known as Kuala Lumpur City).

Kuala Lumpur City 
Zhafri joined current club Kuala Lumpur City (formerly Kuala Lumpur FA) in December 2015. He was part of the team that won the 2021 Malaysia Cup.

International career

Zhafri was called up for national team for the first time by new head coach Kim Pan Gon replacing Darren Lok for the international friendly matches with Philippines and Singapore. He did not play in either match.

Career statistics

Club

Honours
Malaysia
 King's Cup runner-up: 2022

Kuala Lumpur City
 Malaysia Premier League: 2017
 Malaysia Cup: 2021
 AFC Cup runner-up: 2022
 Piala Sumbangsih runner-up: 2022

References

External links
 

 

1994 births
Living people
People from Selangor
Malaysian footballers
Kuala Lumpur City F.C. players
Association football midfielders